Reginald James Hugh Arbuthnot (2 June 1853 – 19 September 1917) was an English businessman and amateur cricketer who played two first-class cricket matches for Kent County Cricket Club.

Early life
Arbuthnot was born at Brighton in Sussex, the son of William and Elizabeth Arbuthnot. His father was a partner in the Indian banking firm Arbuthnot & Co based in Madras and was a member of the Indian Council. He was the grandson of Sir William Arbuthnot, 1st Baronet.

The family lived at Brigden Place in Bexley in Kent and Arbuthnot was educated at Rugby School. Whilst at Rugby he played cricket in the school XI.

Business career
After leaving school Arbuthnot spent an extended time in India on business working for the family firm as well as working in England as a coffee broker. He was a member of the Madras Legislative Council in 1891–1892. The firm failed "spectacularly" in 1906, although Arbuthnot was wealthy enough to continue to live in London without needing to work.

Cricket
Arbuthnot played cricket twice for Kent. His first-class debut came in 1881 and, after time in India, his second appearance was in 1890. He played non first-class cricket for a range of teams, including MCC, Blackheath Cricket Club and Madras Cricket Club.

Later life and family
Arbuthnot died suddenly of heart failure in 1917 aged 64 leaving an estate worth over £14,000. His nephew, Hugh Spottiswoode, also played two first-class matches for Kent.

References

External links

English cricketers
Kent cricketers
Reginald
1853 births
1917 deaths